Artha Benson "Deacon" Litz (August 2, 1897 in DuBois, Pennsylvania – January 3, 1967 in Daytona Beach, Florida) was an American racecar driver active primarily during the 1920s and 1930s.

Personal life
Litz was a hotel-keeper by trade, and was said to weigh 16 stone (224 pounds).

Due to his fame as a racecar driver, he appeared in the 1929 silent film Speedway.

Racing career
He started racing with his own home-made car on dirt tracks at county fairs soon after World War I.  Deacon began his professional career in 1927 and appeared in the 1929 silent film, Speedway, as a racecar driver.

Litz was a star when the Dusenburg and Miller racing cars dominated the American tracks.  He participated in many well-known races throughout his career, including the Indianapolis 500 and the Vanderbilt Cup.

His best finish at the Indianapolis 500 Speedway was placing fourth in 1934.  He was a 12-time starter at the Indianapolis 500.   Litz was inducted into the Auto Racing Hall of Fame in 1964.

He retired from the sport after his last Indianapolis 500 race in 1941. Litz was noted for being an excellent speaker regarding the sport of speedway racing after his retirement.  Litz died in Daytona Beach, Fla., in 1967.

Indy 500 results

Litz was the first person to apply to be in the 1935 Indy 500, putting in his application six months before the race date.

References

1897 births
1967 deaths
People from DuBois, Pennsylvania
Indianapolis 500 drivers
AAA Championship Car drivers
Racing drivers from Pennsylvania